The   and   tournaments is a split season format for Spanish-speaking sports leagues. When used in the United States and Canada, they are known as the Spring and Fall seasons.

The Americas 
The  is held in the first half of the calendar year in Bolivia, Colombia, Haiti, Paraguay and Uruguay while it is held in the second half of the calendar year in Costa Rica, El Salvador, Guatemala, Honduras, Mexico and Nicaragua.

Some, however, use different terminology:
 Colombia:  and 

In most leagues, each tournament constitutes a national championship in itself. Thus, two championship titles are awarded per year in the first group of leagues, and only one in the second. In Mexico and Colombia, for instance, the winners of each tournament play each other at the beginning of the following season for another title, but this is a rather minor season curtain-raiser, akin to national Super Cups in European leagues. Some  and  tournaments also have second stages to decide the winner.

In leagues with 12 or fewer teams, each  and  has a double round-robin format, as a means to fill in the gaps caused by the lack of elimination cup competitions as in most European countries. In leagues with 16 or more teams, each tournament has a single round-robin format.

Relegations, if any, are done on an aggregate basis; usually the combined table for both tournaments determine relegation placements. In some leagues, the average points over the previous two or three seasons are used to determine relegation.

Peru abolished its  and  format after the 2008 season but brought it back for the 2014 season. Starting in 2009, the Ecuadorian championships were decided by a final between stage or group winners, maintaining the half-year tournament format.

Argentina 
Argentine Football Association (AFA) president Julio Grondona proposed in December 2008 the return to a single championship per season format,  and at the conclusion of the 2014  season this happened, with the 2015 season taking a European style year long season from February to December. The AFA later decided to change its season to one spanning two calendar years; as such, the 2016 season is an abbreviated tournament held from February to May, followed by an August-to-June season from 2016–17 forward.

Belize 
The Premier League of Belize, created in 2012 by the merger of two rival top-level leagues, began a split season in 2012–13. The Opening Season takes place in the second half of the calendar year, with the Closing Season following in the first half of the next calendar year. Like most Latin American leagues, it crowns two separate champions in each season. However, its format is significantly different from that of most other leagues, being more similar to the system used by Major League Soccer in the United States and Canada.

In the first split season (2012–13), the league's 12 teams were divided into two six-team zones. During the first half of the season, every team played a double round-robin within its zone, plus single games against four teams from the opposite zone, resulting in a 14-game schedule. The top two teams from each zone qualified for a playoff round, with the top team from each zone matched against the second-place team from the other zone in the two-legged semifinals. The semifinal winners advanced to a two-legged final. In the second half of the season, only eight of the initial 12 teams competed; all teams played a double round-robin in that half of the season, followed by a four-team knockout playoff (again two-legged throughout).

The number of teams participating in the top flight dropped to seven for the 2013–14 season. Each half of that season will have the same format as the 2013 Closing Season.

Brazil 
The Brazilian national league is a notable tournament in Latin America not to split the season into two parts, using a single-season double round-robin format to decide the champions, similar to those in European leagues, though played between May and December.  Brazilian clubs also participate in the state leagues from January to April, some of which do feature a split season format. Brazil also has, unlike most Latin American nations, a national cup.

In 1967 and 1968 the Taça Brasil and Torneio Roberto Gomes Pedrosa were run in the same year, making these years de facto Apertura and Clausura seasons. Both tournaments' winners are recognized as Brazilian champions.

Canada 
For the 2019 season only, the Canadian Premier League adopted a split-season format divided into Spring and Fall seasons. The winner of each part of the season advances to the Canadian Premier League Finals. Following the traditional standard for soccer in the United States and Canada, the season is entirely contained within a calendar year, running April to November. The CPL did not follow a simple double round-robin format; the spring season was an uneven 10 match season, while the fall season was a triple round robin, 18 match season.

United States 
The NASL adopted a split-season format in 2013, divided into Spring and Fall Championships. Following the traditional standard for soccer in the United States and Canada, the season is entirely contained within a calendar year. It follows a format more similar to that of Nicaragua, Peru, Uruguay and Venezuela — each part of the season is conducted in a double round-robin format, with the winner of each part of the season advancing to a championship final known as the Soccer Bowl. The NASL is now defunct.

Elsewhere

Soviet Union 
The USSR Championship in football among "exhibition teams" (later "teams of masters") started in 1936. Its first season (1936) contained a split-season format for all four tiers of the championship including Groups (A, B, V, and Ghe). In 1976 a split-season format was once again revived for the Top League only and for a single season. On both occasions the seasons were conducted in a single round-robin tournament.

Belgium 
In Belgium a large reform of the Belgian football league system was performed in 2016, which reduced the number of professional teams to 24, with only 8 teams remaining at the second level, called Belgian First Division B. From the 2016–17 season until the 2019–20 season, the 8 teams played two tournaments, with the winners of both tournaments playing a two-legged playoff to determine the overall champion. This format was abolished for the 2020–21 season, and the competition reverted to a traditional format played from August to April.

Japan 
For most of its history (except in 1996) the J. League in Japan had a similar system for its first division, although it was called 1st Stage and 2nd Stage. The seasons became unified in 2005, partially to avoid conflicts with the Emperor's Cup. It briefly resumed the same format for 2015 and 2016 seasons.

The Japan Football League, at the fourth tier, briefly introduced the format from 2014 to 2019.

Singapore 
The first season of S.League in 1996 was played in split seasons and a playoff model, with the first series being named Tiger Beer Series, and the second series being named Pioneer Series. Winners of both series then played each other at the end of the season in a championship Playoff, with the winner of the Playoff being crowned the first champion of S.League. This split seasons format has not been used since the first season.

South Korea

The K-League of South Korea also had the same system in 1984, 1986, 1995, 2004, 2005, and 2006. In 2007, it again became unified because of confusion among fans.

All the following leagues are their country's top national division (Div 1) unless otherwise indicated.

Other sports
In baseball, the Double-A Southern and Texas Leagues in the United States both use a similar system, dividing the March–October regular season in half, with records being cleared mid-season, and the top teams mid-season and at the end of the season clinching spots in the playoff for the league pennant (the remainder of playoff slots being filled by wild cards). This system is used in some Single-A leagues, as well. The March–September Chinese Professional Baseball League and winter Mexican Pacific League also follow the same structure, using a team's win record in each stage to determine which advance to the playoffs. Japan's Pacific League had a split season format from 1973 to 1982, with a mini-playoff between the two winners to determine the league's champion.

While Little League Baseball does not mandate any specific scheduling format to be used by local leagues, it recommends dividing the regular season in half and having the first-half winner play against the second-half winner at the end of the season for the championship.

All League of Legends leagues operate on a split-season system, with one split in the spring and one in the summer. The fall is reserved for each league's playoffs and the League of Legends World championship. Qualification to the World Championship is decided through two avenues: winning the second split of the season, or, for the five biggest leagues, through a system that awards points based on a team's performance in each of the splits. Unlike most other split-season formats, the summer split is more important than the spring split; coming second in the summer split is worth as many points as winning the spring split.

The first four seasons of the National Hockey League used a half-season system, with the winners of the two half-seasons playing in the league final.

References

Association football terminology